In the 2019–20 season, Al Sadd SC is competing in the Qatar Stars League for the 47th season, as well as the Emir of Qatar Cup and the Champions League.

Squad list
Players and squad numbers last updated on 20 September 2019.Note: Flags indicate national team as has been defined under FIFA eligibility rules. Players may hold more than one non-FIFA nationality.

Pre-season and friendlies

Competitions

Overview

{| class="wikitable" style="text-align: center"
|-
!rowspan=2|Competition
!colspan=8|Record
!rowspan=2|Started round
!rowspan=2|Final position / round
!rowspan=2|First match	
!rowspan=2|Last match
|-
!
!
!
!
!
!
!
!
|-
| Qatar Stars League

| Matchday 1
| 3rd
| 21 August 2019
| 20 August 2020
|-
| Emir of Qatar Cup

| Round of 16 
| To be confirmed
| 6 February 2020
| In Progress
|-
| Qatar Crown Prince Cup

| Semi-finals
| style="background:gold;"|Winner
| 11 January 2020
| 17 January 2020
|-
| Sheikh Jassim Cup

| Final 
| style="background:gold;"| Winner
| colspan=2| 17 August 2019
|-
| Champions League

| Round of 16
| Semi-final
| 6 August 2019
| 22 October 2019	
|-
| Champions League

| Group stage
| To be confirmed
| 11 February 2020
| In Progress
|-
| FIFA Club World Cup

| First round 
| Second round 
| 11 December 2019
| 17 December 2019
|-
! Total

Qatar Stars League

League table

Results summary

Results by round

Matches

Emir of Qatar Cup

Qatar Cup (ex) Crown Prince Cup

Sheikh Jassim Cup

FIFA Club World Cup

2019 AFC Champions League

Knockout stage

Round of 16

Quarter-finals

Semi-finals

2020 AFC Champions League

Group stage

Group D

Squad information

Playing statistics

|-

|-
! colspan=16 style=background:#dcdcdc; text-align:center| Players transferred out during the season

Goalscorers
Includes all competitive matches. The list is sorted alphabetically by surname when total goals are equal.

Transfers

In

Out

Notes

References

Al Sadd SC seasons
Qatari football clubs 2019–20 season
Sadd